The Nkole or Banyankole are a Bantu ethnic group native to Uganda. They primarily inhabit Ankole. They are closely related to other Bantu peoples of the region, namely the Nyoro, Kiga, Toro and Hema peoples.

Names 
There are several names they are referred to as. These include the following ones: Ankole, Ankori, Banyankole, Banyankore, Nkoles, Nkore, Nyankole, Nyankore, Ouanyankori, Runyankole, Runyankore, Uluyankole, Uluyankore.

References

Other sources 
 John Roscoe, The Banyankole: the second part of the report of the Mackie Ethnological Expedition to Central Africa, Cambridge University Press, Cambridge, 1923, 176 p.

External links
  « Nkole (peuple d'Afrique) » (notice LCSH, BnF)

Ethnic groups in Uganda